The National Academy Orchestra of Canada (NAO) is a professional training orchestra primarily based in Hamilton, Ontario, Canada. Founded in 1989 by conductor Boris Brott, it is recognized as a Canadian National School for professional training, and each winter over 400 potential apprentices audition from across Canada for a spot in the orchestra.

The National Academy Orchestra is the orchestra-in-residence—for 16 to 20 weeks—of the 20-year-old Brott Music Festival, Canada's largest orchestral music festival. Young musicians between the ages of 18 and 30 who are studying or are recent graduates of a music program are eligible to apply and audition for one of 45 spots in the annual program.

Training approach

The program is based on the Mentor-Apprentice approach to learning, and successful applicants are paired in the stands with established professionals from North America's finest orchestras including the Toronto, Hamilton, Montreal, Vancouver, Edmonton, National Arts Centre and Canadian Opera Company Orchestra to name a few.

Each season features guest concertmasters and mentors from across the country, guest conductors, and master classes with internationally renowned soloists. The performance opportunities range from orchestral, chamber, to solo performance. These are not the only aspect of the NAO's activities - the orchestra also takes part in mock auditions, seminars, and performance classes. The season begins with an intense six-week chamber music session where weekly concerts are coached and prepared by some of Canada's finest pedagogues.

The NAO places particular emphasis on entrepreneurial skills through these master classes and seminars. It also incorporates a real-to-life rehearsal and performance schedule as part of its training program. Mentors have included Pinchas Zukerman, Richard Roberts, Anton Kuerti, Richard Dorsey, Alain Trudel, Lara St. John, Jens Lindemann, Jean-Norman Iadeluca, Jacques Israelvitch, Mark Skazinetsky, and Walter Prystawski. Guest conductors of the NAO have included Zukerman, Trudel, Brian Jackson, Raffi Armenian and Steven Mercurio. Artistic advisors and composers-in-residence have included Gary Kulesha, Omar Daniel, Alexina Louie, Srul Irving Glick and Kelly-Marie Murphy.

Similarity to New World Orchestra
The NAO is the only program of its kind in Canada. The only other similar program is the New World Orchestra under Michael Tilson Thomas, based in Miami, Florida.

Graduates

Graduates from the National Academy Orchestra hold, or have held positions with virtually every major orchestra across Canada (e.g. Toronto Symphony, Vancouver Symphony, National Arts Centre Orchestra, Orchestre Symphonique de Montréal, Kitchener-Waterloo Symphony, Symphony Nova Scotia, Thunder Bay Symphony Orchestra, Winnipeg Symphony Orchestra, Edmonton Symphony, Calgary Philharmonic Orchestra) and orchestras across North America and around the world. Many form their own ensembles, go on to be teachers or entrepreneurs across the country.

Performance highlights
In July 2002, the NAO was invited to perform for Pope John Paul II and an audience of 800,000 as part of World Youth Day 2002 celebrations in Toronto. On August 23, 2007, the NAO performed Mahler's Symphony No. 8 "Symphony of a Thousand" to a sold-out audience at FirstOntario Concert Hall's Great Hall. It was only the eighth performance of the massive work in Canadian history and was the summer finale to the 20th anniversary season of the Brott Music Festival.

Funding support
The NAO is recognized as a National School and receives funding from the Canada Arts Training Fund (prior to 2009 called the National Arts Training Contribution Program) through the Department of Canadian Heritage. It also receives funding through the Career Focus Program of Service Canada.

References

External links 
Official website
Brottmusic.com
Thespec.com

Canadian orchestras
Musical groups established in 1989
1989 establishments in Ontario
Musical groups from Hamilton, Ontario